Melesio "Mel" Casas (November 24, 1929 – November 30, 2014) was an American artist, activist, writer and teacher who is best known for his paintings that address Chicano topics. He used visual statements, his sense of humor and love of puns to "address cultural stereotypes." His work has been collected by the San Antonio Museum of Art, Smithsonian American Art Museum, Museum of Fine Arts, Houston, Crystal Bridges Museum of American Art (Bentonville, Arkansas), as well as national and international private collectors. His most important series consists of 150+ large-scale paintings called "Humanscapes" that were painted between 1965 and 1989. Casas, who served as president of the Con Safo art group, was also well known as a writer and theorist.  His "Brown Paper Report" is regarded as an important Chicano document. Casas emphasized the importance of "self-determination" and equality for Chicanos/as. He is regarded as one of the foundational figures of Chicano Art. Casas felt that once artists had a fair chance to exhibit in the United States, then they would become part of "Americana."

Biography 
Casas was born in  El Paso, Texas to Mexican parents during the Great Depression. He grew up and lived in El Segundo Barrio. His father liked to draw and this influenced Casas to start drawing on his own. As a young man decided that he wanted to be an artist. Casas felt that he had a good education in elementary school and junior high. He attended El Paso High School which he chose in order to get a better education. At the time, there were more Anglo students at El Paso High and Casas felt alienated from the other students because of his background and heavy Mexican accent. It was Casas' first encounter with discrimination. He graduated from high school in 1948. After graduating high school, Casas worked for Pacific Fruit Express, a railroad company, as an iceman. He also helped with his father's Swedish massage business located in downtown El Paso.

Later, Casas was called into the United States Army and his father insisted it was his duty to serve. Casas served in the Korean War from 1950 to 1953, where he was injured and subsequently returned to the United States. Casas was awarded a Purple Heart for bravery in the war.

Casas went to college using the G.I. Bill. First, he started to study psychology, due to practical considerations, but later changed to art and teaching. In college, he had a very strong background in classical art theory, drawing and painting. He received a BA in 1956 from Texas Western College (now the University of Texas at El Paso). Casas then received a MFA from the University of the Americas in Mexico City in 1958.

Casas received an all-level certificate to teach in Texas. He was considered by his students to be a "generous" teacher, helping to launch many young art careers. Casas taught art at Jefferson High School in El Paso, Texas for about three years. One of his students was Gaspar Enriquez.

Casas served as president of the San Antonio-based Con Safo art group (1971-73). Con Safo is a Pachuco slang expression whose most common meanings are: "the same to you," "don't mess with this," and "forbidden to touch." In its abbreviated form, C/S, it is commonly used to protect murals from defacement. The art group adopted the name "Con Safo" on December 19, 1971, at which time Casas presented his "Brown Paper Report," which listed 22 mostly sardonic definitions for the term Con Safo. The six co-founders of El Grupo regard Con Safo as the final reorganization of the group they cofounded in 1968. Casas, who initially thought he was founding a new group, subsequently concurred in this assessment. In December of 1971, the Con Safo group consisted of Felipe Reyes, Jose Esquivel, Jesse Almazán, Roberto Ríos, and Jose Garza (Jesse "Chista" Cantú, the other El Grupo member, was excluded at this time), and the two newly inducted members, Mel Casas and Jesse Treviño. Other notable artists who subsequently joined the group include Rudy Treviño (who subsequently served as the group's last president), Santos Martínez, César Martínez, Amado Peña, Jr., Carmen Lomas Garza,  Kathy Vargas, Roberto Gonzalez, and Rolando Briseño. Several of the artists in the group were students of Casas, who was teaching at San Antonio College. Through the Con Safo group, members discussed Chicano art and politics, as well as other issues. They gained exposure by participating in exhibitions. Beginning in 1972, they required insurance and charged  exhibiting institutions a fee. Con Safo was considered influential and helped Chicano art receive recognition when Chicanos and their work were largely excluded from museums and galleries.

Casas taught for 29 years at San Antonio College where he was Chair of the Art Department for 12 years. Casas felt that he had the opportunity to teach a "very good cross-section of the city" which was something he enjoyed. Being the chair of the department, however, was stressful for Casas, since he was often on call. He retired in 1990. After retiring, Casas and his wife Grace went to Italy, spending two years in Brandisi and two in Sicily.

Casas had a two-year battle with cancer. He died in his home with his family and his wife of 35 years, Grace Casas. He and Grace had one child, Bruce. With his first wife, Maria, Mel had four children: Alfredo, Ingrid, Mike and Sonya.

Art 
Casas was first recognized for his work in the abstract expressionist style which was considered "typical" for his time period in the United States. Casas recalls that eventually he felt that the abstract work was too "pretty" and it wasn't the right artistic language for him. After the mid 1960s he began to do more representational work. He was very interested in dealing with the objectification of women in media and "debunking" racial stereotypes.

Though Casas is best known for a handful of works that treat Chicano themes, he created an unusually wide array of works with varied themes and styles. He used clever word play mixed with imagery. He challenged stereotypes, especially in some of the works in his "Humanscape" series.

The 153 paintings that make up the "Humanscape" series were inspired by a "glimpse of a drive-in movie screen." Cordova, who curated four Humanscape exhibitions with approximately half of the paintings, divides the Humanscapes into five groups. In the first group, from 1965 through 1967, Casas made depictions of audiences watching films at drive-in cinemas and conventional movie theaters. The blurry, nebulous audience members were gradually endowed with more color and form, and from late 1967 through 1970, many Humanscape paintings dealt with the Sexual Revolution. Casas began making politically themed paintings in 1968, and he emphasized this subject matter from 1970 through 1975. From 1975 through 1981, Casas' favorite topic was art about art. Finally, from 1982 through 1989, the last Humanscapes treated what Casas called the "Southwestern clichés." 

In this series, Casas focuses on imagery from popular culture and how these media images can and do affect viewers who Casas had referred to as voyeurs since his earliest works in the Humanscape series. "Humanscapes" addresses various issues, such as Chicano politics and identity by using biting humor, pop culture and folk art. His incorporation of imagery from Mexican and Pre-Columbian iconography in conjunction with pop art was unique. His choice of subject matter, which satirized racism and may show sexualized nudes, was often considered to be "provocative." Casas felt that media, like television, movies and advertising had the power to change people and could be used to change them for the better. His paintings often reacted to these media types by using erotic themes to highlight the effect that media had on the viewer. The "Humanscapes" were generally painted on large-scale canvases, mimicking the drive-in movies that inspired them. The text chosen for many of the "Humanscapes" help create visual "conundrums" that are meant to allow the viewer to question and re-interpret the ideas that are juxtaposed with the imagery. Earlier "Humanscapes" had limited palette choices, but later paintings had more colors and were rather vibrant. As Casas' paintings became more colorful, they also began to have a richer sense of satire and visual play.

Casas often paid a price for his trenchant social criticism. He was designated "Artist of the Year" by the San Antonio Art League for 1968, only to have this honor revoked  three days later. Casas, who referred to the dominant notion of beauty as the "Barbie doll ideal," spoke of the privileges of blond hair and blue eyes while he undressed a Barbie doll during his San Antonio Art League lecture, which is why his award was taken away. 

As a fellow artist, he was good at asking critical questions of the work of others and encouraging them to submit their work to exhibitions and competitions.

In later years, he ceased exhibiting, but painted almost daily, even when he was battling cancer.

Quotes 

To me, being an outsider is the next thing to being an artist. I think we are lucky to be born outsiders. The other thing, however, is this. You think that, because you eat tortillas and you think in Spanish or in the Mexican tradition, you can identify yourself. I don't think it's quite true. First of all, because we use liquitex, and we use canvas, and we use stretcher boards. 'No usamos bastidores o manta.' So we are a mixture. So there is no sense in trying to say that we have that kind of purity. We are entirely different. We are neither Mexican nor Anglos. We are in between.

Chicano Art is not Art for Art's Sake, but Art for Human Sake.

I don't think we should break away from our tradition. We cannot deny it. It will tend to flavor, to color the way we think. I think linguistically and iconographically we will tend to mix the two. I have to my benefit that I can combine English and Spanish to give a more colorful expression than I would if I said it all in English or all in Spanish. The subtlety of the meanings, the syntax, or the pronunciation of the words give it something that is missing.

Further reading 
Cordova, Ruben C. (2009). Con Safo: The Chicano Art Group and the Politics of South Texas. Los Angeles: UCLA Chicano Studies Research Center Press.

Cordova, Ruben C. (2011). "The Cinematic Genesis of the Mel Casas Humanscape, 1965-1967". Aztlán 36 (2). 

Hickey, David (1988). "Mel Casas: Border Lord." Artspace: Southwestern Contemporary Arts Quarterly 12, no. 4: 28–31.

Karlstrom, Paul (1996). "Oral History Interview with Mel Casas, 1996 Aug. 14 and 16". Archives of American Art. Smithsonian Institution.

Casas, Mel. (6 May 1976). "Art on the Border." Lecture delivered at University of Texas at El Paso. El Paso, United States. Retrieved 7 April 2015.

References

External links 
 Mel Casas Home Page
 Brown Paper Report

1929 births
2014 deaths
American artists
American artists of Mexican descent
Artists from Texas
Chicano
United States Army personnel of the Korean War
United States Army soldiers